James "Wiley" Harker (January 27, 1915 – May 1, 2007) was an American character actor who portrayed Crane Tolliver in the soap opera General Hospital in 1983. He also played Justice Harold Webb in First Monday in October (1981). He also appeared in Things to Do in Denver When You're Dead as Boris Carlotti, and The Straight Story as Verlyn Heller.

Filmography

References

External links

Obituary

American male soap opera actors
American male film actors
1915 births
2007 deaths
20th-century American male actors